Tar Taing (also spelt Tadaing, Tataing, Tatai, Tartaing, or Tar Tine) is a village in the Shwe Hlay village tract, Sagaing Township, Sagaing Region, Myanmar. The village lies near the Irrawaddy River in the southwestern corner of the township. Tar Taing has about 80 households and is near the border with Myinmu and Ngazun Township.

Between 1 and 2 March 2023, Myanmar Army allegedly carried out an massacre of civilians from the village.

References 

Populated places in Sagaing Region